Jason Finn (born October 27, 1967) is an American musician, best known as the former drummer and singer for The Presidents of the United States of America. He was previously the drummer of Love Battery until 1995 (and also played drums for the Seattle-based band Skin Yard as well as The Fastbacks), when he joined Chris Ballew and Dave Dederer to form The Presidents of the United States of America, who were together for 23 years, until their split in 2016. He plays with an open-handed technique on a right-handed drum kit. He and Dave Dederer collaborated with Sir Mix-a-Lot, to form Subset in 1998, but later disbanded. In 1998, he joined The Pin-Ups with high school friend, Dejha Colantuono. In 2000, The Pin-Ups released an album called Backseat Memoirs.

References

External links 
 The Presidents of the United States of America official website 

American rock drummers
1967 births
Living people
Grunge musicians
The Presidents of the United States of America (band) members
Love Battery members
20th-century American drummers
American male drummers
Skin Yard members
20th-century American male musicians